Metro Natolin is a station on Line M1 of the Warsaw Metro, located in the Natolin neighbourhood of the Ursynów district in the south of Warsaw at the junction of Aleja KEN and Belgradzka. It is near Galeria Ursynów, a small local shopping centre and a local shopping street.

The station was opened on 7 April 1995 as part of the inaugural stretch of the Warsaw Metro, between Kabaty and Politechnika.

References

External links

Railway stations in Poland opened in 1995
Line 1 (Warsaw Metro) stations